Leucoptera plagiomitra is a moth in the Lyonetiidae family. It is known from Australia.

They probably mine the leaves of their host plant.

External links
Australian Faunal Directory
Australian Insects

Leucoptera (moth)
Moths of Australia